This is the complete list of Asian Games medalists in squash from 1998 to 2018.

Events

Men's singles

Men's team

Women's singles

Women's team

References 
Asian Games Medalists

Squash
medalists